Alao is a village on the narrow east coast of Tutuila Island, American Samoa. It is located close to the island's easternmost point, just to the north of Aunu'u Island. Alao is home to white sand beaches, and is one of the oldest settlements in all of American Samoa. It is located in Vaifanua County, American Samoa.
 
The village gained international attention in 2005 when the village council moved to ban Asian-owned businesses within village boundaries. Its ranking chief, Sogimaletavai Leo, told reporters that the village wanted to protect small Samoan-owned businesses. He also explained that it has been an increased number of Asian-owned stores popping up in neighboring villages on the island's east end.

Olomoana Hill behind Alao is one of very few places in Tutuila where trachyte occurs.

A Church of Jesus Christ of Latter-day Saints is located in town.

Demographics

Geography
Alao is situated near the southeastern tip of Tutuila Island, where the hamlet of Utumea is located. There is a white sand beach that stretches the whole length of the village of Alao.

References

External links

 Alao

Villages in American Samoa